Brunswick Baths is a Victorian Heritage Register listed building in Brunswick, an inner-city suburb of Melbourne, Victoria.

The building was designed in 1913 by architecture firm Peck & Kemter and built in 1914. Peck & Kemter also designed the "Ryder Stand" at Victoria Park, the former home ground of the Collingwood Football Club.

The Baths were renovated in 1927  and again between 2011 and 2013.

References

Heritage-listed buildings in Melbourne
Swimming venues in Australia
Public baths in Australia
Buildings and structures in the City of Merri-bek
Buildings and structures completed in 1914
1914 establishments in Australia
Sport in the City of Merri-bek